Growth differentiation factor 10 (GDF10) also known as bone morphogenetic protein 3B (BMP-3B) is a protein that in humans is encoded by the GDF10 gene.

GDF10 belongs to the transforming growth factor beta superfamily that is closely related to bone morphogenetic protein-3 (BMP3). It plays a role in head formation and may have multiple roles in skeletal morphogenesis. GDF10 is also known as BMP-3b, with GDF10 and BMP3 regarded as a separate subgroup within the TGF-beta superfamily.

In mice, GDF10 mRNA is abundant in the brain, inner ear, uterus, prostate, neural tissues, blood vessels and adipose tissue with low expression in spleen and liver. It is also present in bone of both adults and neonatal mice. Human GDF10 mRNA is found in the cochlea and lung of foetuses, and in testis, retina, pineal gland, and other neural tissues of adults.

References

Further reading

Developmental genes and proteins
TGFβ domain